Tuna pot, marmitako in Basque Country and marmita, marmite or sorropotún in Cantabria is a fish stew that was eaten on tuna fishing boats in the Cantabrian Sea. Today it is a simple dish with tuna, potatoes, onions, peppers, and tomatoes.

The original French word marmite is a metal pot with lid. This French word marmite or the Spanish equivalent marmita gives name to the dish in the East and Central Coast of Cantabria while the Cantabrian word sorropotún is used in the West Coast. Marmitako in Basque language means 'from the pot'.

History 
Tuna pot was eaten by Basque fishermen during fishing season. As they stayed a long time at sea, the food used to go bad, so they ate the tuna they fished with cooked potatoes and choricero peppers that kept well.

See also
 List of tuna dishes

References

Spanish soups and stews
Tuna dishes
Basque cuisine
Cantabrian cuisine
National dishes
Potato dishes
Fish stews